Bag of Hits is a compilation album by the band Fun Lovin' Criminals.

Track listing 
 "The Fun Lovin' Criminal" - 3:12
 "Up on the Hill" - 4:26
 "Loco" - 3:54
 "Korean Bodega" - 2:48
 "King of New York" - 3:46
 "Run Daddy Run" - 3:46
 "The Grave and the Constant" - 4:46
 "Swashbucklin' in Brooklyn" - 3:47
 "Love Unlimited" - 3:25
 "Bump" - 3:43
 "Scooby Snacks" - 3:03
 "Smoke 'Em" - 4:45
 "Couldn't Get It Right" - 3:46
 "Big Night Out" - 3:38
 "We Have All the Time in the World" - 3:39

Bonus disc
Early editions of the album featured a second disc of remixes:

 "The Fun Lovin' Criminal" (DJ Bombjack Remix) - 3:38
 "King of New York" (Cooley High Remix) - 3:31
 "Run Daddy Run" (MC Large Mix) 3:55
 "Up on the Hill" (Cobble Hill Remix) 3:47
 "Loco" (Latin Quarter Version) 4:02
 "Bump" (Mark Berkley's Bump Remix) 6:55
 "The Grave and the Constant" (Stephen Lironi 12" Mix) 5:40
 "King of New York" (Jack Danger's Mix Complex #1) 5:40
 "Up on the Hill" (Tar Beach Remix) 4:50
 "Korean Bodega" (Aero Mexicana Remix) 2:57
 "Love Unlimited" (Remix) 3:50
 "Scooby Snacks" (Rockamental Version) 2:58

Most of the tracks had previously been featured as B-sides to singles: tracks 1, 2, 4 & 9 were previously unreleased.

Artwork 
The photo was taken in Williamsburg, Brooklyn, New York. The photo session included multiple body shots, and lasted around 3 hours. The art director met the model at an art show for Andrés García-Peña.

References

Fun Lovin' Criminals albums
2002 compilation albums
EMI Records compilation albums